Dolina is a former settlement in the Municipality of Kamnik in central Slovenia. It is now part of the village of Špitalič. The area is part of the traditional region of Upper Carniola. The municipality is now included in the Central Slovenia Statistical Region.

Geography

Name
Dolina was attested in historical sources as Tal and Tall in 1360, and Klaintall in 1488. The name Dolina is a common toponym in Slovenia as well as other Slavic countries (cf. villages named Dolina in Bulgaria, Poland, and Russia). The name is derived from the common noun dolina 'valley', referring to the local topography.

History
Dolina  was annexed by Bela in 1952, ending its existence as an independent settlement. It was later transferred to Špitalič.

Cultural heritage
There is a chapel-shrine in Dolina dedicated to the Rosary. It stands in the northeast part of the settlement and dates from 1912.

References

External links
Dolina on Geopedia

Populated places in the Municipality of Kamnik
Former settlements in Slovenia